Dos Rios is a planned Sacramento RT light rail infill station in Sacramento, California. It will be served by the Blue Line. The staggered platforms are located on North 12th Street between Sunbeam Avenue and Richards Boulevard. The station is being constructed to provide transit to a low-income housing project adjacent to the site, and was partially funded by a grant from the California Strategic Growth Council.

References

Sacramento Regional Transit light rail stations
Railway stations under construction in the United States